Route 132 is a New Brunswick provincial collector road that runs  between Dieppe and Shediac.

The western section is known locally as Champlain Street which consists of a four lane undivided urban arterial. The remainder of the road is a two-lane rural facility. It connects to Route 11 at its eastern terminus and to Route 106 at the western end. Route 132 also provides grade-separated links to Route 2 and Route 15.

Communities
 Dieppe
 Lakeburn
 Malakoff
 Meadow Brook
 Painsec
 Scoudouc and crosses the Scoudouc River
 Shediac

Major destinations
 Moncton International Airport (cargo)
 École Mathieu-Martin
 Scoudouc Industrial Park

See also
List of New Brunswick provincial highways

References

132
132
Shediac
Transport in Dieppe, New Brunswick